Ramapati Shastri is an Indian politician and a member of 6th, 7th, 10th, 11th, 12th, 13th and 17th Legislative Assembly of Uttar Pradesh of India. Currently he is serving as Cabinet Minister of Social Welfare and Minister of SC & ST Welfare in the Yogi Adityanath government. He represents the Mankapur (Assembly constituency) in Gonda district of Uttar Pradesh and is a member of the Bharatiya Janata Party.

Early life and education
Shastri was born 15 October 1952 in Bishnoharpur village of Gonda district to  his father Ram Laut. He belongs to Koli Community. He married Lt. Mangla Devi, with whom he has one son and one daughter. He passed high school and intermediate examination from Gandhi Inter College, Nawabganj. In 1984, he received the degree of Shastri from Sampurnanand Sanskrit University, Varanasi.

Political career
Shastri has been MLA for seven strength terms. In 1974, his first election, he became an MLA on the Jan Sangh ticket from the Dixir reserved seat. He lost the elections to Babulal of Congress in 1980 and 1985. In 1989, he became MLA from BJP for the third time. Fourth time after winning elections in Ramlahar in 1991, he was made a cabinet minister in Kalyan Singh's government. During this tenure, he held the ministry of Social Welfare and Revenue Department. Fifth time he again won election in 1993 from Diksir. In 1996, after winning for sixth time he was again appointed Cabinet Minister for Medical Health and Family Welfare Department in the BJP government. In the 2002 election, he lost to SP's Babulal. During this time, the BJP made him the National President of the Scheduled Castes Morcha. In the 2007 election, he lost to Bahujan Samaj Party candidate Ramesh Gautam.

In 2012, the Dixir assembly seat came out of reservation in the name of Tarabganj. This time Shastri contested from Balrampur Sadar secured seat, but lost. Since 2017, he has represented the Mankapur (Assembly constituency) in Gonda district of Uttar Pradesh and is a member of the Bhartiya Janta Party. In 2017 elections, he defeated his nearest rival Bahujan Samaj Party candidate Ramesh Chandra Gautam by a record margin of 60,161 votes.

Posts held

See also
Uttar Pradesh Legislative Assembly

References

1952 births
Koli people
Living people
Bharatiya Janata Party politicians from Uttar Pradesh
State cabinet ministers of Uttar Pradesh
Uttar Pradesh MLAs 2017–2022